The New Haven City Hall and County Courthouse is located at 161 Church Street in the Downtown section of New Haven, Connecticut. The city hall building, designed by Henry Austin, was built in 1861; the old courthouse building, now an annex, designed by David R. Brown, was built in 1871–73. They stand on the east side of the New Haven Green.

The pair of buildings was listed on the U.S. National Register of Historic Places in 1975. They are significant early examples of High Victorian Gothic architecture in the United States. The city hall building's most striking feature used to be a clock tower that rose above. It is shown in historic drawing among the accompanying photographs. In 1992, a memorial to those involved in the Amistad incident, the Amistad memorial, was erected in front of city hall, facing the New Haven Green, as this was the site of the prison where the Africans aboard the Amistad were held and tried.

In January 2012, a PureCell Model 400 was dropped into place behind City Hall in the Millennium Plaza. The heat produced by the fuel cell will be used to heat and cool City Hall and the Hall of Records. It will supply 60 percent of the buildings' heating needs, and 30 percent of cooling needs. According to Giovanni Zinn of the city's Office of Sustainability, the PureCell can help the city save up to $1 million in energy costs over the next ten years.

See also

 National Register of Historic Places listings in New Haven, Connecticut

References

Courthouses on the National Register of Historic Places in Connecticut
City and town halls on the National Register of Historic Places in Connecticut
Buildings and structures in New Haven, Connecticut
Clock towers in Connecticut
County courthouses in Connecticut
National Register of Historic Places in New Haven, Connecticut
City and town halls in Connecticut